Carlos Adrian Sansores Acevedo (born 25 June 1997) is a Mexican taekwondo athlete. He won the gold medal at the 2018 Pan American Championships on the men's heavyweights and the silver medal at the 2019 World Taekwondo Championships.

References

External links
 

1997 births
Living people
Mexican male taekwondo practitioners
Pan American Games medalists in taekwondo
Pan American Games bronze medalists for Mexico
Taekwondo practitioners at the 2019 Pan American Games
Medalists at the 2019 Pan American Games
Taekwondo practitioners at the 2020 Summer Olympics
People from Chetumal, Quintana Roo
Sportspeople from Quintana Roo
Olympic taekwondo practitioners of Mexico
21st-century Mexican people